Palm-leaf manuscripts are manuscripts made out of dried palm leaves. Palm leaves were used as writing materials in the Indian subcontinent and in Southeast Asia reportedly dating back to the 5th century BCE. Their use began in South Asia and spread to other regions, as texts on dried and smoke-treated palm leaves of Palmyra palm or the talipot palm.
Their use continued till the 19th century, when printing presses replaced hand-written manuscripts.

One of the oldest surviving palm leaf manuscripts of a complete treatise is a Sanskrit Shaivism text from the 9th-century, discovered in Nepal, now preserved at the Cambridge University Library. The Spitzer Manuscript is a collection of palm leaf fragments found in Kizil Caves, China. They are dated to about the 2nd-century CE and are the oldest known philosophical manuscript in Sanskrit.

History 

The text in palm leaf manuscripts was inscribed with a knife pen on rectangular cut and cured palm leaf sheets; colourings were then applied to the surface and wiped off, leaving the ink in the incised grooves. Each sheet typically had a hole through which a string could pass, and with these the sheets were tied together with a string to bind like a book. A palm leaf text thus created would typically last between a few decades and about 600 years before it decayed due to dampness, insect activity, mold and fragility. Thus the document had to be copied onto new sets of dried palm leaves. The oldest surviving palm leaf Indian manuscripts have been found in colder, drier climates such as in parts of Nepal, Tibet and central Asia, the source of 1st-millennium CE manuscripts.

The individual sheets of palm leaves were called Patra or Parna in Sanskrit (Pali/Prakrit: Panna), and the medium when ready to write was called Tada-patra (or Tala-patra, Tali, Tadi). The famous 5th-century CE Indian manuscript called the Bower Manuscript discovered in Chinese Turkestan, was written on birch-bark sheets shaped in the form of treated palm leaves.

Hindu temples often served as centers where ancient manuscripts were routinely used for learning and where the texts were copied when they wore out. In South India, temples and associated mutts served custodial functions, and a large number of manuscripts on Hindu philosophy, poetry, grammar and other subjects were written, multiplied and preserved inside the temples. Archaeological and epigraphical evidence indicates existence of libraries called Sarasvati-bhandara, dated possibly to early 12th-century and employing librarians, attached to Hindu temples. Palm leaf manuscripts were also preserved inside Jain temples and in Buddhist monasteries.

With the spread of Indian culture to Southeast Asian countries like as Indonesia, Cambodia, Thailand, and the Philippines, these nations also became home to large collections. Palm-leaf manuscripts called Lontar in dedicated stone libraries have been discovered by archaeologists at Hindu temples in Bali Indonesia and in 10th century Cambodian temples such as Angkor Wat and Banteay Srei.

One of the oldest surviving Sanskrit manuscripts on palm leaves is of the Parameshvaratantra, a Shaiva Siddhanta text of Hinduism. It is from the 9th-century, and dated to about 828 CE. The discovered palm-leaf collection also includes a few parts of another text, the Jñānārṇavamahātantra and currently held by the University of Cambridge.

With the introduction of printing presses in the early 19th century, the cycle of copying from palm leaves mostly came to an end. Many governments are making efforts to preserve what is left of their palm leaf documents.

Relationship with the design of writing systems
The round and cursive design of the letters of many South Indian and Southeast Asian scripts, such as Devanagari, Nandinagari, Kannada, Telugu, Lontara, Javanese, Balinese, Odia, Burmese, Tamil, Khmer, and so forth, may be an adaptation to the use of palm leaves, as angular letters could tear the leaves apart.

Regional variations

India

Odisha 
Palm leaf manuscripts of Odisha include scriptures, pictures of Devadasi and various mudras of the Kama Sutra. Some of the early discoveries of Odia palm leaf manuscripts include writings like Smaradipika, Ratimanjari, Pancasayaka and Anangaranga in both Odia and Sanskrit. State Museum of Odisha at Bhubaneswar houses 40,000 palm leaf manuscripts. Most of them are written in the Odia script, though the language is Sanskrit. The oldest manuscript here belongs to the 14th century but the text can be dated to the 2nd century.

Kerala

Tamil Nadu 

In 1997 The United Nations Educational Scientific and Cultural Organisation (UNESCO) recognised the Tamil Medical Manuscript Collection as part of the Memory of the World Register. A very good example of usage of palm leaf manuscripts to store the history is a Tamil grammar book named Tolkāppiyam which was written around 3rd century BCE. A global digitalization project led by the Tamil Heritage Foundation collects, preserves, digitizes and makes ancient palm-leaf manuscript documents available to users via the internet.

Indonesia 

In Indonesia the palm-leaf manuscript is called lontar. The Indonesian word is the modern form of Old Javanese . It is composed of two Old Javanese words, namely  "leaf" and  "Borassus flabellifer, palmyra palm". Due to the shape of the palmyra palm's leaves, which are spread like a fan, these trees are also known as "fan trees". The leaves of the rontal tree have always been used for many purposes, such as for the making of plaited mats, palm sugar wrappers, water scoops, ornaments, ritual tools, and writing material. Today, the art of writing in  still survives in Bali, performed by Balinese Brahmin as a sacred duty to rewrite Hindu texts.

Many old manuscripts dated from ancient Java, Indonesia, were written on rontal palm-leaf manuscripts. Manuscripts dated from the 14th to 15th century during the Majapahit period. Some were found even earlier, like the Arjunawiwaha, the Smaradahana, the Nagarakretagama and the Kakawin Sutasoma, which were discovered on the neighboring islands of Bali and Lombok. This suggested that the tradition of preserving, copying and rewriting palm-leaf manuscripts continued for centuries. Other palm-leaf manuscripts include Sundanese language works: the Carita Parahyangan, the Sanghyang Siksakandang Karesian and the Bujangga Manik.

Myanmar (Burma) 

In Myanmar, the palm-leaf manuscript is called pesa (ပေစာ). In the pre-colonial era, along with folding-book manuscripts, pesa was a primary medium of transcribing texts, including religious scriptures, and administrative and juridicial records. The use of pesa dates back to 12th century Bagan, but the majority of existent pesa date to the 1700-1800s. Key historical sources, including Burmese chronicles, were first originally recorded using pesa. The Burmese word for "literature," sape (စာပေ) is derived from the word pesa. The Universities' Central Library in Yangon houses the country's largest collection of traditional manuscripts, including 15,000 pesa.

In the 17th century, decorated palm leaf manuscripts called  or kammawasa (ကမ္မဝါစာ) emerged. The earliest such manuscript dates to 1683. These decorated manuscripts include ornamental motifs, and are inscribed with ink on lacquered palm leaves gilded with gold leaf. Kammavaca manuscripts are written using a tamarind-seed typeface similar to the style used in Burmese stone inscriptions.

Preparation and preservation
The palm leaves are first cooked and dried. The writer then uses a stylus to inscribe letters. Natural colourings are applied to the surface so the ink will stick in the grooves. This process is similar to intaglio printing. Afterwards, a clean cloth is used to wipe out the excess ink and the leaf manuscript is done. Details can be found in videos listed in the external links section.

See also 
 Birch bark manuscript
 Folding-book manuscript
 Gandhāran Buddhist texts
 Ho trai, library of Thai Temple
 Pitakataik, scriptural libraries in Myanmar
 Orihon, a concertina-folded book format originating in China and popularized in Japan

References

Further reading
Production of manuscripts
"Engraving Balinese letter on a Lontar at Udayana University Bali". Published by Lontar Library of Udayana University on 22 Jan 2012.
"How to ink up an inscribed palm leaf manuscript". Published by Mellon Sawyer Seminar Eurasian Manuscripts of University of Iowa on 22 Feb 2017.
"How to make the Palm Leaf Manuscripts". Published by Palm Leaf Manuscript Study & Research Library of University of Kelaniya on 20 Jul 2016.
"Ola Leaf manuscripts". Published by OpportunitySriLanka.com on 4 Dec 2013.
Preservation of manuscripts
"Traditional preservation method for oiling palm leaf manuscript leaves in Myanmar". Video by Hlaing Hlaing Gyi at the University of Yangon Library in Myanmar. Uploaded 20 Oct 2016.
Jarusawat, P., & Cox, A. M. (2023). Community-driven care of Lanna palm-leaf manuscripts. IFLA Journal, 49(1), 132–142.
"தமிழ் சுவடிகள்: உண்மையும் நமது கடமையும்". Published by Neelakandan Nagarajan Researcher Tamil Manuscripts, International Institute of Tamil Studies, Tharamani, Chennai, Tamil Nadu, India, On 8 July 2019
"தமிழ் சுவடிகள்: உண்மையும் நமது கடமையும் [பாகம் 2]". Published by Neelakandan Nagarajan Researcher Tamil Manuscripts, International Institute of Tamil Studies, Tharamani, Chennai, Tamil Nadu, India, On 14 Juல்ய் 2020

External links

 Palm-leaf manuscripts at Asiatic Library, Calcutta
 Online Resources
 Digitised examples of palm leaf manuscripts can be viewed online here.
 Making a palm leaf manuscript (video), Arnab LHT, via youtube, October 2020.

Manuscripts by type
Palm trees in culture
Memory of the World Register
Hindu literature